Timothy David Scott (born 21 September 1971) is an instrumental recording artist primarily known for his solo instrumental guitar compositions. These have subsequently given rise to his secondary side project/collaborations and sessions with the dance DJs and producers: Judge Jules, Mike Koglin, Serial Diva and Herd & Fitz.

Early life
Scott was born and brought up in Hazel Grove, a suburb of Stockport, England. He left school at 16 and went on to Salford College of Music "but dropped out before he got kicked out" finding he could not cope with the written work due to his dyslexia.

In August, 1992 at the age of 20, Tim applied to study full-time on the 1 year Diploma course in modern Electric Guitar Performance at The Guitar Institute (GI), London (now known as The Institute of Contemporary Music Performance) commencing his studies on 21 September 1992 he graduated achieving the grade Pass on 3 July 1993.

Music career
Scott's recording career began in 2003 when he self-released his debut album Bald on the Inside, distributing it and performing live sets in Borders Books & Music Stores across the UK. The album peaked inside their top 200 sellers list and received generally positive reviews.

The Bald on the Inside press reviews opened the opportunity for Scott to work with BBC Radio 1 DJ Judge Jules, writing and performing on the instrumental guitar track "Puesta Del Sol" for Judge Jules' debut album Proven Worldwide. Scott played live improvised guitar over his backroom Funky House/Dirty Electro DJ set during the BBC Radio 1 weekend in Ibiza on 15 and 16 August 2005. From 2005-2008 Scott performed at clubs in Ibiza and the UK alongside Judge Jules and other artists such as Jon Fitz and Katherine Ellis.

Scott's second solo album, Guitar Mashing, was released on 26 November 2008. The album was critically well-received, with Total Guitar describing Scott's music as "mashing his guitar mastery (think Vai and Satriani) with chilled Ibiza sounds." Since the release of Guitar Mashing Scott has been concentrating on releasing singles online. The first single, "Amy Jane", was released in late 2009 to positive reviews.

At the end of July 2010, Scott took delivery of his own Jackson Soloist signature guitar described by The Manchester Evening News – "The Hazel Grove musician has finally got his hands on his one-off sparkly pink Custom Shop Jackson Guitar in his signature shade…"

Discography

Studio albums

EPs

Singles

Session and collaboration discography

Studio albums

Singles

References

External links

Official website
Discogs discography

1971 births
English composers
English male guitarists
English session musicians
Living people
Music in the Metropolitan Borough of Stockport
Musicians from Manchester
People from Hazel Grove
21st-century British guitarists
21st-century British male musicians